Adam de Cardonnel or Adam Cardonnel may refer to:
 Adam Mansfeldt de Cardonnel-Lawson, born Adam Cardonnel, (1746/7–1820), Scottish antiquarian
 Adam de Cardonnel (died 1719) (1663–1719), English administrator